The Battle of Barking Creek was a friendly fire incident over England on  that caused the first death of a British fighter pilot in the Second World War.

Battle

At  on 6 September 1939, a radar fault led to a false alarm that unidentified aircraft were approaching from the east at high altitude over West Mersea, on the Essex coast. No. 11 Group RAF ordered six Hawker Hurricanes to be scrambled from 56 Squadron, based at North Weald Airfield in Essex. The sector controller, Group Captain David Frederick Lucking, sent up the entire unit of 14 aircraft. Unbeknown to the rest of the pilots, two pilot officers took up a pair of reserve aircraft and followed at a distance.

Hurricanes from 151 Squadron (also from North Weald), and Supermarine Spitfires from 54, 65 and 74 Squadrons based at Hornchurch Airfield scrambled. None of the Royal Air Force pilots had been in action and few had seen a German aircraft. Communication between the pilots and ground control was poor and there was no procedure for pilots to distinguish between British and Luftwaffe aircraft. Identification friend or foe (IFF) sets were still being developed and had not been installed in many RAF aircraft.

With everyone in the air expecting to see enemy aircraft and no experience of having done so, 'A' Flight of 74 Squadron saw what they believed were German aeroplanes, and their commander, Adolph "Sailor" Malan, allegedly gave an order to engage. Two of the three, Flying Officer Vincent 'Paddy' Byrne and Pilot Officer John Freeborn, opened fire. Malan later claimed to have given a last-minute call of "friendly aircraft – break away!", but, if this was true, it was not heard by Byrne and Freeborn. Richard Hough and Denis Richards wrote that further losses were prevented by the 151 Squadron commanding officer, Squadron Leader Edward Donaldson, who alerted his pilots that the attacking aircraft were British and gave the order not to retaliate.

Frank Rose and Pilot Officer Montague Hulton-Harrop were shot down, and Hulton-Harrop was killed. Hulton-Harrop was the first British pilot killed in the war, and his Hurricane was the first aircraft shot down by a Spitfire. A Spitfire was shot down by British anti-aircraft fire.

Aftermath

Court martial

The court martial of John Freeborn and Paddy Byrne at Bentley Priory, the headquarters of Fighter Command, was held in camera. In 2019, The National Archives released limited records, previously restricted, including the Operations Record Books of the relevant RAF Fighter Squadrons and certain court documents. The court martial transcript has not been released  According to Bill Nasson in a 2009 publication, it is well known that Freeborn felt that his commanding officer, Sailor Malan, tried to evade responsibility for the attack. Malan testified for the prosecution against his pilots, stating that Freeborn had been irresponsible, impetuous and had not taken proper heed of vital communications. During the trial, Freeborn's counsel, Sir Patrick Hastings, called Malan a bare-faced liar.

The court exonerated both pilots, ruling that the case was an unfortunate accident. In 1990, Hough and Richards wrote, 

In 2003, Patrick Bishop wrote that the incident exposed the inadequacies of RAF radar and identification procedures, leading to their being greatly improved by the time of the Battle of Britain, a view echoed in a 2012 publication by Philip Kaplan.

Careers

Montague Hulton-Harrop is buried with a war grave headstone at St Andrew's Church in North Weald. As an engineering officer who was in the General Duties Branch and could be assigned to non-engineering duties, Lucking was moved. He was returned to engineering duties later that month as OC (Officer Commanding) 32 MU, transferred to the new Technical Branch in 1940 and was promoted to air commodore in December 1941. He died in 1970, aged 75. Frank Rose was killed in action over Vitry-en-Artois, France, on 18 May 1940. Malan went on to be one of the most successful Allied fighter pilots of the war, shooting down 27 Luftwaffe aircraft and rising to group captain. He received the Distinguished Service Order and bar and the Distinguished Flying Cross. On his return to South Africa he worked against the apartheid regime until his death in 1963.

Paddy Byrne was shot down and captured over France in 1940. He was detained at Stalag Luft III with his former defence lawyer Roger Bushell. In 1944 he was repatriated, having convinced the Germans and the repatriation board that he was mad. On his return to England he was unable to reinstated into the RAF and given a ground position; he was unable to return to combat roles because of his repatriation on medical grounds and served as a liaison officer for returning POWs and subsequently in the Far East on Lady Mountbatten's staff. John Freeborn flew more operational hours in the Battle of Britain than any other pilot, remained on operations for the rest of the war and proved to be an outstanding airman. He was awarded the Distinguished Flying Cross and bar and rose to wing commander. Freeborn finally told some of his version of events in a 2002 biography A Tiger's Tale, before co-authoring a more complete account in Tiger Cub. In 2009, Freeborn told an interviewer of his regret about Hulton-Harrop's death, saying, "I think about him nearly every day. I always have done... I've had a good life, and he should have had a good life too". Freeborn was twice married, first in 1941 to Rita Fielder, who died in 1979, and then Peta in 1983, who died in 2001. Freeborn died on 28 August 2010 and was survived by a daughter from his first marriage.

See also
 Air attack on the fortress of Koepenick
Friendly fire incidents of World War II

References

Bibliography

Books
 
 
 
 
 
 
 
 

Journals

Further reading

External links
 North Weald Airfield story of the incident
 RAF Museum lecture

Barking Creek
Barking Creek
Barking Creek
Barking Creek
1939 in the United Kingdom
Aviation accidents and incidents in England
Accidents and incidents involving Royal Air Force aircraft
Aviation accidents and incidents in 1939
Combat incidents
September 1939 events